"Peace with Honor" was a phrase U.S. President Richard M. Nixon used in a speech on January 23, 1973 to describe the Paris Peace Accords to end the Vietnam War. The phrase is a variation on a campaign promise Nixon made in 1968: "I pledge to you that we shall have an honorable end to the war in Vietnam." The Accords specified that a ceasefire would take place four days later. According to the plan, within sixty days of the ceasefire, the North Vietnamese would release all U.S. prisoners, and all U.S. troops would withdraw from South Vietnam. On March 29, 1973, the last U.S. soldier left Vietnam. On 30 April 1975, Saigon fell to North Vietnamese troops.

Closely connected with the phrase is the idea that Nixon claimed in 1968 to have a secret plan to end the war. Nixon never made such a claim during his campaign, but neither did he explain how he would achieve peace. Therefore the assumption that he had a secret plan became a widespread belief and is commonly misattributed as a direct quote.

Earlier uses

 49 BC Cicero "Until we know whether we are to have peace without honour or war with its calamities, I have thought it best to for them to stay at my house in Formiae and the boys and girls too."
 ca. 1145 Theobald II, Count of Champagne "Peace with honor" written in a letter to King Louis VII of France.
 1607 William Shakespeare "That it shall hold companionship in peace/With honour, as in war."
 1775 Edmund Burke "The superior power may offer peace with honor and with safety…  But the concessions of the weak are concessions of fear."
 1878 Benjamin Disraeli (British prime minister) "Lord Salisbury and myself have brought you back peace—but a peace I hope with honour, which may satisfy our sovereign and tend to the welfare of our country." Said upon returning from the Congress of Berlin. Wags paraphrased this as "Peace with honour — and Cyprus too."
 1916 Wilson Business Men's League "Wilson and peace with honor or Hughes with Roosevelt and War?" Part of U.S. President Woodrow Wilson's reelection campaign.
1934 A. A. Milne (English writer) "'Peace with Honour' a denunciation of war" A. A. Milne#Biography
 1938 Neville Chamberlain (British prime minister) "My good friends, for the second time in our history, a British Prime Minister has returned from Germany bringing peace with honour. I believe it is 'peace for our time.' Go home and get a nice quiet sleep." Said upon returning from the Munich Conference.
 1938 Winston Churchill criticizing Chamberlain's appeasement with Hitler, commented: "You were given the choice between war and dishonour. You chose dishonour, and you will have war." Churchill's position was later vindicated by the German invasion of Poland, which compelled Britain to declare war, under the Anglo-Polish military alliance.
 1939 Józef Beck speaking in Sejm on 5th of May 1939 in response to Hitler's demands for annexating Free City of Danzig to the Third Reich "We in Poland do not know the meaning of a peace at every price. There is only one thing in the life of people, nations and states that is priceless. That thing is the honour."

See also
Decent interval
Peace for our time

References

External links
Complete Text of Nixon's Speech

Presidency of Richard Nixon
American political catchphrases
Vietnam War